The Song of the hoe or the Creation of the pickax is a Sumerian creation myth, written on clay tablets from the last century of the 3rd millennium BCE.

Disputations

Seven debate topics are known from the Sumerian literature, falling in the category of disputations; some examples are: The Debate between sheep and grain; The Debate between bird and fish; the Debate between Winter and Summer; and The Dispute between Silver and Copper, etc. These topics came some centuries after writing was established in Sumerian Mesopotamia. The debates are philosophical and address humanity's place in the world. Some of the debates may be from 2100 BC. The song of the hoe stands alone in its own sub-category as a one-sided debate poem.

Compilation

Three tablets of the myth are held by the British Museum, numbers 80170, 132243 (unpublished) and 139993. Two tablets of the myth are held by the Louvre in Paris, number AO 7087 & AO 8898. One is held in the Vorderasiatisches Museum Berlin, number 17378 and three at the Yale Babylonian collection, numbers 5487, 7070 and 11941. Lines of the myth were discovered on the University of Pennsylvania Museum of Archaeology and Anthropology, catalogue of the Babylonian section (CBS), from their excavations at the temple library at Nippur. Tablets from this collection, numbers 8111, 13122, 13382 and 13864 were documented by Edward Chiera in "Sumerian Epics and Myths". Samuel Noah Kramer included CBS  tablets 8531, 10310, 10335, 29.16.23, 29.16.436. He also included translations from tablets in the Nippur collection of the Museum of the Ancient Orient in Istanbul, catalogue numbers 1117, 2337, 2473, 2742. Other tablets were added from the "Ur excavations texts" in 1928 along with several others to bring it to its present form, which is virtually complete. The latest composite text and translation was produced in 1996 by H. Behrens, B. Jagersma and Joachim Krecher.

Story
The poem is composed of the frequent use of the word "al", which means hoe. The verb-forms and nouns also frequently start with, or contain the syllable "al" (or "ar"), suggesting the writer intended it for humour as a satirical school text or as a tongue-twister. The song starts with a creation myth where Enlil separates heaven and earth in Duranki, the cosmic Nippur or 'Garden of the Gods'.

The myth continues with a description of Enlil creating daylight with his hoe; he goes on to praise its construction and creation. Enlil's mighty hoe is said to be made of gold, with the blade made of lapis lazuli and fastened by cord. It is inlaid with lapis lazuli and adorned with silver and gold. Enlil makes civilized man, from a brick mould with his hoe – and the Annanuki start to praise him. Nisaba, Ninmena, and Nunamnir start organizing things. Enki praises the hoe; they start reproducing and Enlil makes numerous shining hoes, for everyone to begin work. Enlil then founds the Ekur with his hoe whilst a "god-man" called Lord Nudimmud builds the Abzu in Eridug. Various gods are then described establishing construction projects in other cities, such as Ninhursag in Kesh, and Inanna and Utu in Zabalam; Nisaba and E-ana also set about building. The useful construction and agricultural uses of the hoe are summarized, along with its capabilities for use as a weapon and for burying the dead. Allusions are made to the scenes of Enkidu's ghost, and Urshanabi's ferry over the Hubur, in the Epic of Gilgamesh:

Ninmena is suggested to create both the priestess and king. The hymn ends with extensive praisings of the hoe, Enlil, and Nisaba:

Discussion

Modern society may have trouble comprehending the virtue of extolling a tool such as the lowly hoe, for the Sumerians the implement had brought agriculture, irrigation, drainage and the ability to build roads, canals and eventually the first proto-cities. One of the tablets from the Yale Babylonian Collection was published by J.J. Van Dijk which spoke of three cosmic realms; heaven, earth and kur in a time when darkness covered an arid land, when heaven and earth were joined and the Enlil's universal laws, the me did not function. Two of the major traditions of the Sumerian concept of the creation of man are discussed in the myth. The first is the creation of mankind from brick moulds or clay. This has notable similarities to the creation of man from the dust of the earth in the Book of Genesis in the Bible. This activity has also been associated with creating clay figurines. The second Sumerian tradition which compares men to plants, made to "break through the ground", an allusion to imagery of the fertility or mother goddess and giving an image of man being "planted" in the ground. Wayne Horowitz notes that five Sumerian myths recount a creation scene with the separation of heaven and earth. He further notes the figurative imagery relaying the relationship between the creation of agricultural implements making a function for mankind and thereby its creation from the "seed of the land". The myth was called the "Creation of the Pickax" by Samuel Noah Kramer, a name by which it is referred in older sources. In Sumerian literature, the hoe or pickaxe is used not only in creation of the Ekur but also described as the tool of its destruction in city-lament hymns such as the Lament for Ur, where it is torn apart with a storm and then pickaxes.

The cosmological position of the hoe does not fit into Charles Long's categorization of cosmogenic myths. Creation has been suggested to have been the responsibility of different gods via different processes. Creation via a cosmological agricultural implement seems to occupy a unique place in the creation myth genre. The song was meant to be sung aloud with the repetition of the word hoe or "al" a total of forty five times in the text with common use of the two syllables together "al"/"ar". A cosmological link is suggested between the hoe's being and its doing; making everything prosper and flourish within a community. Gary Martin discusses the sociological benefits of singing songs to a hoe, to remind people that they wield the implement of Enlil and of creation. That they can participate in creativity and work well to preserve and improve society. He suggests that "perhaps by praising the simple tool of an extremely important group of laborers, and imbuing it with cosmological significance, those wielders of the hoe are themselves brought into a grand cosmological drama."

See also

 Barton Cylinder
 Debate between sheep and grain
 Debate between bird and fish
 Debate between Winter and Summer
 Enlil and Ninlil
 Self-praise of Shulgi (Shulgi D)
 Old Babylonian oracle
 Hymn to Enlil
 Kesh temple hymn
 Lament for Ur
 Sumerian creation myth
 Sumerian disputations
 Sumerian religion
 Sumerian literature

References

Further reading

 Civil, Miguel., "Review of CT 44", Journal of Near Eastern Studies 28, 70-72: 70, 1969.
 Civil, Miguel., The Farmer's Instructions. A Sumerian Agricultural Manual. (Aula Orientalis Supplementa, 5) Editorial Ausa: Sabadell, 1994.
 Edzard, Dietz Otto., "U 7804 // UET VI/1 26: "Gedicht von der Hacke"", in George, A. R. (ed.), and Finkel, I. L., Wisdom, Gods and Literature: Studies in Assyriology in Honour of W. G. Lambert, Eisenbrauns: Winona Lake, 131-135, 2000.
 Farber, Gertrud., ""Das Lied von der Hacke", ein literarischer Spass?", in Klengel, Horst and, Renger, Johannes (eds.), Landwirtschaft im Alten Orient: ausgewählte Vorträge der XLI. Rencontre Assyriologique Internationale Berlin., 4.-8.7.1994 (Berliner Beiträge zum Vorderen Orient, 18), Dietrich Reimer Verlag: Berlin, 369-373, 1999.
 Farber, Gertrud., "Sumerian Canonical Compositions. A. Divine Focus. 1. Myths: The Song of the Hoe (1.157)", in Hallo, William W. (ed.), The Context of Scripture, I: Canonical Compositions from the Biblical World. Brill: Leiden/New York/Köln, 511-513, 1997.
 Jacobsen, Thorkild., "Sumerian Mythology, a Review Article", Journal of Near Eastern Studies 5, 128-152: 134, 1946.
 Kramer, Samuel Noah., Sumerian Mythology. The American Philosophical Society: Philadelphia, 51-53, 1944.
 Pettinato, Giovanni., Das altorientalische Menschenbild und die sumerischen und akkadischen Schöpfungsmythen. Winter: Heidelberg, 82-85, 1971.
 Wilcke, Claus., "Hacke - B. Philologisch", in Reallexikon der Assyriologie 4, 33-38: 36-38, 1972.

External links

 Cheira, Edward., Sumerian Epics and Myths, University of Chicago, Oriental Institute Publications, 1934. Online Version
 Song of the hoe., Black, J.A., Cunningham, G., Robson, E., and Zólyomi, G., The Electronic Text Corpus of Sumerian Literature, Oxford 1998-.
 Composite text - The Electronic Text Corpus of Sumerian Literature, Oxford 1998-.
 Bibliography - The Electronic Text Corpus of Sumerian Literature, Oxford 1998-.

3rd-millennium BC literature
Sumerian disputations
Clay tablets
Mesopotamian myths
Creation myths
Religious cosmologies
Comparative mythology